Namibia has many islands. Here are some of them:
 Bird Island
 Impalila

Penguin Islands 
The Penguin Islands consist of:

 
Islands
Namibia